Melaleuca undulata, commonly known as hidden honey-myrtle is a shrub in the myrtle family Myrtaceae and is endemic to the south of Western Australia. It is a spreading, moderately dense, perennial, woody shrub with creamy-white flowers in small clusters.

Description

The flowers mainly appear from October to March and are white to cream. The stamens are arranged in bundles of five around the flower, with 8 to 30 stamens in each bundle.

Taxonomy and naming
Melaleuca undulata was first formally described in 1867 by George Bentham in Flora Australiensis. The specific epithet (undulata) is derived from the Latin undulatus meaning "wavy" "in reference to the leaf blade being wavy".

Distribution and habitat
This melaleuca occurs from the Stirling Range – Broomehill district eastwards to the Israelite Bay district. It grows in mallee and heath, swampy areas, river beds and the edge of clay pans in sand, clay or lateritic gravel.

Conservation
Melaleuca undulata is classified as "not threatened" by the Government of Western Australia Department of Parks and Wildlife.

Use in horticulture
This is a hardy species suitable as a low, informal, prickly hedge. It will grow in most soils and aspects.

References

undulatus
Myrtales of Australia
Plants described in 1867
Endemic flora of Western Australia